Cochlioceras is an extinct baltoceratid genus from the lower and middle Ordovician (Arenig - Llanvrin) of what are now Europe, the U.S (Vermont), and China, having existed for approximately 14 million years, from about 478 to 464 mya.

Taxonomy
Cochlioceras was named by Eichwald (1860). Its type is Cochlioceras avus. It was assigned to the Baltoceratidae by Furtnish and Glensiter in Teichert et al. (1964)  and removed, with the Baltoceratidae, from the Ellesmerocerida to the Orthocerida by Kroger et al. (2007)

References

 PaleoBiology Database: Cochlioceras, basic info
 Fossils (Smithsonian Handbooks) by David Ward

Prehistoric cephalopod genera
Ordovician cephalopods
Prehistoric animals of Europe
Molluscs of Europe
Early Ordovician first appearances
Middle Ordovician extinctions
Orthocerida